Patrick Michael O'Donnell (born February 22, 1991) is an American football punter for the Green Bay Packers of the National Football League (NFL). He was drafted by the Chicago Bears in the sixth round of the 2014 NFL Draft, where he served as the team's punter for eight seasons. He played college football at Cincinnati and Miami.

Early life
O'Donnell attended Palm Beach Central High School, and lettered three times in football and track for the Broncos. In high school, he averaged 45.1 yards on punts; He also played kicker, having a 95 percent touchback rate when kicking off, along with making seven field goals as a senior. O'Donnell also played linebacker and tight end.

College career
O'Donnell was ranked a two-star recruit by Rivals.com, and committed to the University of Cincinnati on December 29, 2008. He made his debut with the Bearcats in 2009 as a true freshman against Southeast Missouri State, and appeared in three games before suffering an injury, causing him to redshirt. O'Donnell served as starting punter in the 2010 and 2011 seasons. In the latter season, the Bearcats led the nation in punting average, while O'Donnell averaged 43.8 yards per punt, while leading the nation with 17 punts of 50 yards or more. Additionally, O'Donnell served as kicker on kickoffs, averaging 64.2 yards per kick. O'Donnell ended 2011 with first team all-Big East honors, and was a semi-finalist for the Ray Guy Award. In 2012, O'Donnell punted an average of 41.8 yards, and was named to second team all-Big East.

In 2013, O'Donnell transferred to the University of Miami, citing interests to remain close to family, as his father was suffering from cancer. O'Donnell ended his career with Cincinnati with a 42.6 career punting average. O'Donnell graduated from Cincinnati with a degree in organizational leadership at the end of April, before transferring to Miami as a graduate student. With the Hurricanes, O'Donnell served as punter, kickoff specialist, and holder. O'Donnell recorded a school-record 47.1 punting average, was named first-team all-ACC and the Hurricanes' Special Teams MVP at the end of the 2013 season. O'Donnell concluded his college career with a 43.5-yard punting average.

College statistics

Professional career

At the NFL Scouting Combine, O'Donnell recorded 23 repetitions on the bench press, better than 19 running backs, 21 defensive linemen (including number one draft pick Jadeveon Clowney), and all 37 wide receivers invited.

Chicago Bears

O'Donnell was drafted by the Chicago Bears with the 191st overall pick in the sixth round of the 2014 NFL Draft, the only punter selected in the draft, and the first punter selected by the Bears since Todd Sauerbrun in 1996. He signed a four-year contract on May 13, 2014.

In his rookie season in 2014, O'Donnell finished with 71 punts for 3,107 net yards for a 43.8 average. In the 2015 season, he punted 70 times for 3097 yards in 2015, 28 of which landed in the red zone with only four touchbacks.

In 2016, he finished with 68 punts for 2,994 net yards for a 44.0 average.

In Week 5 of the 2017 season against the Minnesota Vikings, he threw a 38-yard touchdown pass to Benny Cunningham on a fake. Later in the year, O'Donnell served as kickoff specialist against the San Francisco 49ers while kicker Cairo Santos was nursing a groin injury. O'Donnell finished 2017 with 87 punts for 4,097 net yards for a 47.0 average.

On March 15, 2018, O'Donnell signed a one-year contract extension with the Bears worth $1.5 million. After his contract expired following the 2018 season, he received a two-year extension on March 18, 2019.

Early in the 2019 season, O'Donnell served as kickoff specialist for the second time in Week 3 against the Washington Redskins with Eddy Piñeiro treating a knee injury. O'Donnell was also the backup kicker (with backup quarterback Chase Daniel serving as his holder), though Piñeiro kicked through his injury in the game. O'Donnell ended 2019 with a net punting average of 40.7 yards, setting the team record previously held by Adam Podlesh (40.4 in 2011).

O'Donnell signed a one-year contract extension with the Bears on March 12, 2021.

's NFL offseason, O'Donnell held at least two Bears franchise records, including:
 Most Yards / Punt (career): 45.0
 Most Yards / Punt (season): 46.98 (2017)

Green Bay Packers
On March 18, 2022, O'Donnell signed a two-year contract with the Green Bay Packers. He was named NFC Special Teams player of the week for his week 3 performance against the Buccaneers in a 14-12 victory, having seven punts with the longest 63 yards and an average of 48.4. Five of them landed inside the 20-yard line, the most for any of the team’s punters in a game since 1976.

NFL career statistics

Regular season

Postseason

Personal life
O'Donnell was born the oldest of 2 children to Terrance and Michele O'Donnell. His sister, Megan O'Donnell, was an All-American rower and National Champion at Nova Southeastern University. His cousin, Christopher Bordino, was a member of the Navy Midshipmen track team.

In February 2019, he became engaged to Shelby Etter. In March 2020, Etter and O’Donnell got married in Miami.

References

External links
Green Bay Packers bio
Cincinnati Bearcats bio
Miami Hurricanes bio

1991 births
Living people
American football punters
Miami Hurricanes football players
Chicago Bears players
Cincinnati Bearcats football players
Green Bay Packers players
People from Lake Worth Beach, Florida
Players of American football from Florida
Sportspeople from the Miami metropolitan area